Jimmy Sexton (b. August 22, 1963) is Co-Head of Football and Head of Coaching as a Sports Agent for Creative Artist Agency. He has been with the agency since 2011. Sexton is a 1982 graduate of Memphis's Evangelical Christian School and the University of Tennessee, class of 1986.

He signed his first contract as a Sports Agent in 1984 with his client, Hall of Famer Reggie White, who was also his college dorm mate. White became the highest paid defensive professional football player at that time. In 1987, Sexton became one of the youngest agents ever to be licensed by the NFL Players association. 

Sexton is one of the few agents to represent both players and coaches. He represents some of the top NFL stars: Sam Darnold, Julio Jones, Laremy Tunsil, Derrick Henry, Philip Rivers, Daniel Jones, Jason Witten and Ndamukong Suh among others. He represents 11 of the 14 SEC head football coaches and 7 NFL head coaches.

He was listed on the Forbes list of The World's Most Powerful Sports Agents in 2015, 2018, 2019 and 2020.

Philanthropy 
Sexton has served on the board of the Make-A-Wish (Mid-South) foundation and on the board of Hope Christian Community Foundation (Memphis) and Fellowship of Christian Athletes (Memphis).

References 

American sports agents
1963 births
Living people